Lot 26 is a township in Prince County, Prince Edward Island, Canada.  It is part of St. David's Parish. Lot 26 was awarded to Robert Stewart and Peter Gordon in the 1767 land lottery. One half was sold for arrears in quitrent in 1781 and one quarter was granted to Loyalists in 1783.

Communities

Incorporated municipalities:

 Bedeque
 Central Bedeque

Civic address communities:

 Bedeque
 Central Bedeque
 Chelton
 Emerald
 Fernwood
 Freetown
 Lower Bedeque
 Lower Freetown
 Middleton
 Newton
 Searletown
 South Freetown

References

26
Geography of Prince County, Prince Edward Island